Christian Bassemir (born 13 March 1956) is a former field hockey goalkeeper from West Germany, who was a member of the West German team that won the silver medal at the 1984 Summer Olympics in Los Angeles, California. He played club hockey for Hockey-Club Heidelberg.

References

External links
 

1956 births
Living people
German male field hockey players
Olympic field hockey players of West Germany
Field hockey players at the 1984 Summer Olympics
Olympic silver medalists for West Germany
Olympic medalists in field hockey
Medalists at the 1984 Summer Olympics
20th-century German people